Kira Puru is a gender-fluid Australian musician. She is of Maori descent, her father being from the Tainui tribe, and grew up in Cardiff, New South Wales, near Newcastle.  Puru has been described as "Señorita, swagger and a troublemaker" by Triple J whose self-titled EP was released in 2018 by New Tribe Music, a joint venture record label with Sony Music Australia. i-D Magazine called Puru "a charismatic stage persona" and she has performed at festivals and events including: Splendour in the Grass, Spilt Milk, Listen Out, and Groovin' the Moo.

Career
In 2013, Puru moved to Melbourne, Australia, to launch her career as a solo artist after a string of collaborations with Paul Mac, Illy, Paul Kelly and Urthboy.

Puru released the single "Tension" in 2017 then followed on with  "Molotov" which The Guardian said is a "Slinky, attitude-laden song" and was ranked 75th on the Triple J Hottest 100, 2018.  In 2018, Puru toured nationally with Listen Out, and in support of Vera Blue and The Rubens.

In 2019, she toured nationally as the supporting act for Peking Duk and in May, Puru went on a national tour for her single "Everything's Better Without You" with Kinder as support.  The video for her new single "Why Don't We Get Along" was launched by Clash magazine which they described as "Perfect Pop" also produced by long term collaborator Jon Hume (Sofi Tukker).

In 2020 Puru toured with UK artist Yungblud for his Falls Festival side shows where she was compared to US artist Lizzo.  She called out radio for not playing enough Australian Music and Triple J were one of the first to take up her challenge.  In April 2020, Puru released her single "Idiot" with a "hook that’s an effortless ear worm". Junkee Media said "Kira Puru's Tiktok account is fantastic" including luring Tones and I and a bunch of other musicians to imitate the heavy metal band Korn.

Personal life 
Puru uses she/they pronouns.

Discography

Extended plays

Singles

As lead artist

As featured artist

Awards and nominations

National Live Music Awards
The National Live Music Awards (NLMAs) are a broad recognition of Australia's diverse live industry, celebrating the success of the Australian live scene. The awards commenced in 2016.

|-
| rowspan="3" | 2018
| rowspan="3" | Kira Puru
| Live Voice of the Year
| 
|-
| Live R&B or Soul Act of the Year
| 
|-
| Best Live Voice of the Year - People's Choice
| 
|-
| 2020
| Kira Puru
| Victorian Live Act of the Year
| 
|-

References

21st-century Australian singers
Australian musicians
Australian people of Māori descent
Living people
Singers from Sydney
Sony Music Australia artists
Year of birth missing (living people)
Australian pop singers
Non-binary musicians